Dalys Island or Daleys Island is an island on the Mohawk River west of Scotia in Schenectady County, New York.

References

Islands of New York (state)
Mohawk River
River islands of New York (state)